{{Infobox Buddha
 | name            = Amoghasiddhi
 | image           = COLLECTIE TROPENMUSEUM Boeddhabeeld van de Borobudur voorstellende Dhyani Boeddha Amogasiddha TMnr 10025273.jpg
 | image_caption   = Ancient sculpture of Amoghasiddhi Buddha. Borobudur, Central Java, Indonesia
 | sanskrit_name   = अमोघसिद्धिAmoghasiddhi
 | burmese_name    =
 | chinese_name    = 不空成就佛(Pinyin: Bùkōngchéngjiù Fó)
 | japanese_name   = (romaji: Fukūjōju Butsu)
 | karen_name      =
 | khmer_name      = អមោឃសិទ្ធិ()
 | korean_name     = 불공성취불(RR: Bulgongseongchwi Bosal)
 | mongolian_name  = ᠲᠡᠭᠦᠰ ᠨᠥᠭᠴᠢᠭᠰᠡᠨҮйлс бүтээгч(SASM/GNC: Tegüs nögcigsen)
 | okinawan_name   =
 | shan_name       =
 | thai_name       = พระอโมฆสิทธิพุทธะPhraamoksitthiphuttha
 | tibetan_name    = དོན་ཡོད་གྲུབ་པ་<small text>Wylie: don yod grub paTHL: dönyö drubpa</small text>
 | vietnamese_name =  Bất Không Thành Tựu Phật
 | sinhalese_name  =
 | veneration      = Mahāyāna, Vajrayāna
|caption=Statue of Amogasiddha from Borobudur, Central Java, Indonesia}}

Amoghasiddhi (Devanagari: अमोघसिद्धि) is one of the Five Wisdom Buddhas of the Mahayana and Vajrayana tradition of Buddhism. He is associated with the accomplishment of the Buddhist path and of the destruction of the poison of envy. His name means Unfailing Accomplishment. His consort is Tara, meaning Liberator and his mounts are garudas. He belongs to the family of karma whose family symbol is the double vajra.

 Characteristics 
Amoghasiddhi is associated with the conceptual (Skt: samskara) skandha or the conceptual mind (as opposed to the non-conceptual or sensational mind). His action towards the promotion of Buddhist paths is the pacification of evils. This is symbolised by Amoghasiddhi's symbol, the moon. He gestures in the mudra of fearlessness, symbolising his and his devotees' fearlessness towards the poisons or delusions. 
 
He is usually coloured green in artwork and is associated with the air or wind element. His season is autumn and his heavenly quarter is the northern buddha-kṣetra called Prakuta.

In the Śūraṅgama mantra (Chinese: 楞嚴咒; pinyin: Léngyán Zhòu) taught in the Śūraṅgama sutra (Chinese: 楞嚴經; pinyin: Léngyán Jīng), an especially influential dharani in the Chinese Chan tradition, Amoghasiddhi is mentioned to be the host of the Karma Division in the North, one of the five major divisions which controls the vast demon armies of the five directions.

 Gallery 

See also
 Five Dhyani Buddhas

 References 

Further readingMythology of India: Myths of India, Sri Lanka and Tibet'', Rachel Storm, Anness Publishing Limited, Editor Helen Sudell, Page 15, Column 2–4, Line 5, Caption, Page 15, Column 4, Lines 1 – 5

External links
Symbolism of the five Dhyani Buddhas
Sacred Visions: Early Paintings from Central Tibet, an exhibition catalog from The Metropolitan Museum of Art (fully available online as PDF), which contains material on Amoghasiddhi(see index)

Buddhas